In matrix analysis Stahl's theorem is a theorem proved in 2011 by Herbert Stahl concerning Laplace transforms for special matrix functions. It originated in 1975 as the Bessis-Moussa-Villani (BMV) conjecture by Daniel Bessis, Pierre Moussa, and Marcel Villani. In 2004 Elliott H. Lieb and Robert Seiringer gave two important reformulations of the BMV conjecture. In 2015 Alexandre Eremenko gave a simplified proof of Stahl's theorem.

Statement of the theorem
Let  denote the trace of a matrix. In other words, for all real ,
 = , 

References

Conjectures that have been proved
Theorems in analysis
Theorems in measure theory